The 2015–16 Liga Premier de Ascenso season was split in two tournaments Apertura and Clausura. Liga Premier was the third-tier football league of Mexico. The season was played between 14 August 2015 and 15 May 2016.

Torneo Apertura

Changes from the previous season 
46 teams participated in this tournament.

By arrangement of the FMF, the 18 teams of Liga MX created a reserve team to participate in the Liga Premier de Ascenso.
Estudiantes Tecos moved to Zacatecas City and became Mineros de Zacatecas "B".
Internacional de Acapulco moved to State of Mexico and became Atlético Estado de México.
Teca UTN became Chapulineros de Oaxaca after being acquired by new owners.
Irapuato returned to the Liga Premier de Ascenso, after one year in Ascenso MX, because his place was acquired by Murciélagos F.C. 
Murciélagos F.C. started to playing in Ascenso MX, for that reason, Murcielágos Liga Premier team become a reserve team called Murciélagos F.C. B.
Cachorros UdeG  rejoined in the tournament.
Petroleros de Veracruz, C.D. Tepatitlán de Morelos and Athletic Club Morelos, joined the league as expansion teams.
Atlético Coatzacoalcos, Atlético Chiapas and Toros Neza left the league.
Loros UdeC played this season on Liga Premier, waiting to meet the requirements to compete in the Ascenso MX, after winning the 2014–15 season.
Mineros de Fresnillo, champion of the Liga de Nuevos Talentos, remains in that category to not meet the requirements to promote.
C.D. Uruapan, champion of the Tercera División, played in the Liga de Nuevos Talentos, by not meeting the requirements for Liga Premier.

Group 1

Group 2

Group 3 
{{Location map+ |Mexico |width=650|float=right |caption=Location of teams in the 2015–16 LPA Group 3 |places=

Regular season

Group 1

Standings 

Last updated on November 22, 2015.Source: SoccerWay

Results

Group 2

Standings 

Last updated on November 22, 2015.Source: SoccerWay

Results

Group 3

Standings 

Last updated on November 21, 2015.Source: SoccerWay

Results

Regular-season statistics

Top goalscorers 
Players sorted first by goals scored, then by last name.

Source: Liga Premier

Liguilla

Liguilla de Ascenso (Promotion Playoffs) 
The four best teams of each group play two games against each other on a home-and-away basis. The higher seeded teams play on their home field during the second leg. The winner of each match up is determined by aggregate score. In the quarterfinals and semifinals, if the two teams are tied on aggregate the higher seeded team advances. In the final, if the two teams are tied after both legs, the match goes to extra time and, if necessary, a penalty shoot-out.

(*) The team was classified by its position in the season table

Quarter-finals
The first legs was played on 25 and 26 November, and the second legs was played on 28 and 29 November 2015.

First leg

Second leg

Semi-finals
The first legs was played on 2 December, and the second legs was played on 5 December 2015.

First leg

Second leg

Final
The first leg was played on 9 December, and the second leg was played on 12 December 2015.

First leg

Second leg

Liguilla de filiales (Reserve teams Playoffs)

Torneo Clausura

Regular season

Group 1

Standings 

Last updated on April 17, 2016.Source: SoccerWay

Results

Group 2

Standings 

Last updated on April 16, 2016.Source: SoccerWay

Results

Group 3

Standings 

Last updated on April 17, 2016.Source: SoccerWay

Results

Regular-season statistics

Top goalscorers 
Players sorted first by goals scored, then by last name.

Source: Liga Premier

Liguilla

Liguilla de Ascenso (Promotion Playoffs) 
The four best teams of each group play two games against each other on a home-and-away basis. The higher seeded teams play on their home field during the second leg. The winner of each match up is determined by aggregate score. In the quarterfinals and semifinals, if the two teams are tied on aggregate the higher seeded team advances. In the final, if the two teams are tied after both legs, the match goes to extra time and, if necessary, a penalty shoot-out.

(*) Reynosa was classified because Tepatitlán was eliminated by presenting an improper lineup  (+) Tampico Madero qualified for having better results in the regular season than his rival

Quarter-finals
The first legs was played on 20 and 21 April, and the second legs was played on 23 and 24 April 2016.

First leg

Second leg

Semi-finals
The first legs was played on 28 April, and the second legs was played on 1 May 2016.

First leg

Second leg

Final
The first leg was played on 5 May, and the second leg was played on 8 May 2016.

First leg

Second leg

Liguilla de Filiales (Reserve teams Playoffs) 
The four best teams of each group play two games against each other on a home-and-away basis. The higher seeded teams play on their home field during the second leg. The winner of each match up is determined by aggregate score. In the quarterfinals and semifinals, if the two teams are tied on aggregate the higher seeded team advances. In the final, if the two teams are tied after both legs, the match goes to extra time and, if necessary, a penalty shoot-out.

Relegation Table 

Last updated: 17 April 2016 Source: Liga Premier FMFP = Position; G = Games played; Pts = Points; Pts/G = Ratio of points to games played

Promotion Final 
The Promotion Final is a series of matches played by the champions of the tournaments Apertura and Clausura, the game is played to determine the winning team of the promotion to Ascenso MX. 
The first leg was played on 12 May 2016, and the second leg was played on 15 May 2016.

First leg

Second leg

See also 
2015–16 Liga MX season
2015–16 Ascenso MX season
2015–16 Liga de Nuevos Talentos season

References

External links 
 Official website of Liga Premier
 Magazine page 

 
1